Gilson Gomes do Nascimento (born 15 May 1986 in Campo Grande), simply known as Gilson, is a Brazilian footballer who plays as a left back for Volta Redonda.

Career
On 20 April 2015, Gilson joined Ponte Preta on loan from Cruzeiro until the end of the 2015 season. On 24 October, he signed a pre-contract with Macaca.

Honours

Club
CENE
 Campeonato Sul-Matogrossense: 2005

Criciúma
 Campeonato Catarinense: 2013

Botafogo
 Campeonato Carioca: 2018

References

External links

1986 births
Living people
People from Campo Grande
Brazilian footballers
Association football defenders
Campeonato Brasileiro Série A players
Campeonato Brasileiro Série B players
Botafogo Futebol Clube (SP) players
São José Esporte Clube players
Mirassol Futebol Clube players
Cuiabá Esporte Clube players
Paraná Clube players
Grêmio Foot-Ball Porto Alegrense players
América Futebol Clube (MG) players
Cruzeiro Esporte Clube players
Esporte Clube Vitória players
Criciúma Esporte Clube players
Associação Atlética Ponte Preta players
Botafogo de Futebol e Regatas players
Sportspeople from Mato Grosso do Sul